The Sous region (also spelt Sus, Suss, Souss or Sousse) it's a historical, cultural and geographical region of Morocco, which constitutes part of the region administration of Souss-Massa and Guelmim-Oued Noun. The region is known for the argan tree (which has become a symbol of Souss) as well as for being the capital of the Chleuh Berber ethnic group. It is a major commercial and tourist agricultural region of the Kingdom. Vegetable production, shared between very large farms and small producers, contributes to the economic development of the region. The Souss plain produces 40% of Moroccan citrus fruits, and 60% of the production of early vegetables[1]. It is historically a stage of trans-Saharan trade.

History 
Medieval Arab geographers generally divided the Sous region into two distinct sub-regions: al-Sūs al-Aqṣā, or "farther Sus", and al-Sūs al-Adnā, or "nearer Sus". Sus al-Aqsa consisted of the southern/western part, and Sus al-Adna consisted of the northern/eastern part; however, there were never any precise boundaries between the two. The capital of the Sous was at Igli. There was also a ribat at Massa near the Atlantic coast.

Around 683, Uqba ibn Nafi conquered the Sous region, but after his death in 688 his conquests in Morocco slipped out of Muslim control. The Sous was reconquered around 20 years later by Musa ibn Nusayr, who began the spread of Islam among the local population.

Bibliography
Boogert, Nico van den. The Berber Literary Tradition of the Sous: with an edition and translation of 'The Ocean of Tears' by Muḥammad Awzal (d. 1749), Leiden: Nederlands Instituut voor het Nabije Oosten, 1997. 
Montagne, Robert. Les Berbères et le Makhzen dans le sud du Maroc; essai sur la transformation politique des Berbères sédentaires (groupe Chleuh). Rabat: Dar Al-Aman, 2013 .
UNESCO Arganeraie Biosphere Reserve

References

External links
Euratlas Periodis Web - Map of Suss in Year 1600

Natural regions of Africa
Geography of Morocco